Mount Panay is a potentially active stratovolcano located in the province of Batangas, Philippines.

Geography 
Panay is located south of Taal Lake, in the province of Batangas, Philippines.

It is located at the southern end of the Calumpang Peninsula, which forms the western side of Batangas Bay, at latitude 13.723°N (13°43'24"N), longitude 120.893°E (120°53'36"E).

Physical features

Panay is a forested, low, andesitic stratovolcano, on the western side of Batangas Bay, which could be a breached caldera inundated by the sea.

Panay has an elevation of 501 metres (1,644 feet) asl.
 
Panay is reported to be strongly solfataric at present.

Eruptions

Last eruptive activity is thought to be Pleistocene, about 500,000 years ago.

There have been no historical eruptions.

Geology

Rock type is predominantly andesite.

Tectonically, Panay lies at the intersection of two major regional trends, the Bataan Lineament and the Palawan-Macolod Lineament.

Batangas Bay, which includes Panay, may be a drowned caldera.

Listings

Smithsonian Institution lists Panay as Pleistocene - Fumarolic.

Philippines Institute of Volcanology and Seismology (Phivolcs) lists Panay as Inactive.

See also
List of active volcanoes in the Philippines
List of potentially active volcanoes in the Philippines
List of inactive volcanoes in the Philippines
Philippine Institute of Volcanology and Seismology
Pacific ring of fire

References

Stratovolcanoes of the Philippines
Subduction volcanoes
Volcanoes of Luzon
Mountains of the Philippines
Landforms of Batangas
Potentially active volcanoes of the Philippines
Pleistocene stratovolcanoes